John Kingerlee (born 17 February 1936) is an Irish painter currently living on the Beara peninsula, in West Cork. He is a convert to Islam and has a second family in Fez, Morocco.

Career

Early life
John Kingerlee was born in Birmingham, England in 1936. His Mother was related to Hogan's from County Cork and he was educated in a school run by the Marist Fathers. After living for twenty years in Cornwall in the far southwest of Britain, he moved in 1982 to an isolated farmhouse on the Beara Peninsula in West Cork, Ireland.

Current life and works 

On the isolated Beara peninsula, looking directly out from his home across Kenmare Bay to the ring of Kerry, John and his wife Mo lead a life which some might describe as lonely. However, what they lack in human contact they make up for through an existence which extends to growing their own vegetables in their organic garden. The Kingerlees' alternative outlook on life somehow seems to be in complete harmony both with the space they inhabit and with the art that flows from John's palette knife and brush.

A non-conformist at heart, John has turned his back on the traditional way of seeing and depicting landscape - as a series of parallel planes that are made to appear to recede from foreground to background by the artist's manipulation of linear and aerial perspective. Recognising that perspective itself is a mathematical construct, John takes a different approach that is as radical as it is original. He states that he wants his art to recreate the experience of being in and moving through the landscape.

In the studio, using his own made-up pigments, he mimics the cycle of growth and decay by working with matter in a very direct and hands-on way. He applies colours, deep pools of it, red brick, reds, molten silver and zinc, platinum and titanium, sulphuric yellows and so much more to dozens of paintings in various states of becoming. He paints standing up, applying a new layer of paint (finished paintings will comprise fifty to one hundred or more layers of paint applied over a period of several years and when completed can take up to five months to dry out). His preferred tools are palette knives (one in each hand is the norm), and a decorator's brush which he holds vertically using a stippling technique.

Recognition
Kingerlee has exhibited works in Ireland, England, China and The United States of America.  Art critic William Zimmer gave a speech about the artist and his works at the Los Angeles exhibition in October 2006, curated by Masoud Pourhabib. At the time Zimmer was an associate of Katherine T Carter & Associates, an agency hired by Kingerlee's manager to promote the artist in America.

"With some disingenuousness Kingerlee has described himself as an outsider artist. No one this well-traveled could qualify as one and yet there is some truth in his statement. He is operating outside the art world that grabs all the attention; that which is high on technology and resembles popular entertainment more than traditional art practices. John Kingerlee’s art is triumphant because it transcends all such props. It is based in an imagination sustained by enchantment, observed reality, and superlative talent."
William Zimmer - 
a New York Times art critic for 25 Years

Following an extensive marketing campaign around the artist, Kingerlee's "Grid Composition" was sold in Sotheby's Auctioneer's on 15 November 2006 (Lot 462) in New York for $156,000 (£82,591 / €121,788 approx). Art-market interest in the artist subsequently faded.

External links
 Official John Kingerlee Website

20th-century Irish painters
21st-century Irish painters
Irish male painters
People from Birmingham, West Midlands
1936 births
Living people
20th-century Irish male artists